Judge Rao may refer to:

Neomi Rao (born 1973), judge of the United States Court of Appeals for the District of Columbia Circuit
Paul Peter Rao (1899–1988), judge of the United States Court of International Trade